The Shezhuang Temple is a Taoist temple in the Jinqiao district of Shanghai, China. It was built at the end of the Ming dynasty in the 17th century in honour of a man named Jin San. A building of fine Chinese architecture, the temple was originally surrounded by an old village that was demolished in the late 2000s to make space for new developments.

Further reading
 Howard Hampton. Temple in the ruins. Lost in Shanghai, 2012.
 Meggan De Jesus. History Right Around the Corner… Shezhuang Temple. Tai Tai in Shanghai, 2013.

External links
 Official website of the temple

Taoist temples in Shanghai
Religious buildings and structures in Shanghai
17th-century Taoist temples